= Moontype =

American rock band

Moontype is an American indie rock band from Chicago, Illinois. The group was originally a solo project of vocalist Margaret McCarthy while she attended Oberlin College, but later expanded into a full band with guitarist Ben Cruz and drummer Emerson Hunton. As a solo project, McCarthy released her first EP under the Moontype alias titled Fan Music. The band released their debut full-length album, Bodies of Water, in 2021 on Born Yesterday Records.

Moontype expanded into a fully-fledged four-piece since the release of their Bodies of Water LP. The band now features Emerson Hunton on drums, and Joe Suihkonen and Andrew Clinkman on guitar.

In 2025, Moontype signed to Orindal Records, the label run by Advance Base’s Owen Ashworth. The signing coincided with the release of their first music since 2021, single "Long Country."

== Discography ==
Studio albums

- Bodies of Water (2021, Born Yesterday Records)
- I Let the Wind Push Down on Me (2025, Orindal Records)

EPs

- Fan Music (2017, self-released)
